Calliodes appollina is a moth of the family Noctuidae first described by Achille Guenée in 1852. It is found in Africa, including Senegal and South Africa.

References

External links
Description of the female: 

Catocalinae
Owlet moths of Africa
Moths described in 1852